Yucca Valley Airport  is a public use airport located three nautical miles (6 km) east of the central business district of Yucca Valley, a town in San Bernardino County, California, United States. It is owned by the Yucca Valley Airport District.

Facilities and aircraft 
It has one runway designated 6/24 with an asphalt surface measuring 4,363 by 60 feet (1,330 x 18 m).
	
For the 12-month period ending December 31, 2008, the airport had 14,500 general aviation aircraft operations, an average of 39 per day. At that time there were 56 aircraft based at this airport: 89% single-engine, 3.5% multi-engine, 2% helicopter, 2% glider and 3.5% ultralight.

References

External links 

 Aerial photo as of 4 October 1995 from USGS The National Map

Airports in San Bernardino County, California
Yucca Valley, California